Ruud Kuijten (born 7 October 1973 in Nuenen, Netherlands) is a male right-handed badminton player from Belgium. He has won several Belgian National Badminton Championships and participated for his country in Olympic Games.

Biography

Born in the Netherlands, Kuijten changed his nationality later in his life to Belgian. For his new home nation, Kuijten took part in the 2000 Sydney Olympic Games.

Career highlights

1994
Winner Dutch National Championship Men's doubles (together with partner Joris van Soerland)

1999
Winner Belgian National Championship Men's singles
Winner Belgian National Championship Mixed doubles (together with partner Manon Albinus)
Winner European Badminton Circuit Men's singles

2000
Winner Belgian National Championship Men's singles
Winner Belgian National Championship Mixed doubles (together with partner Manon Albinus)
Participation Olympic Games Sydney 2000

2001
Winner Belgian National Championship Men's singles

2002
Winner Belgian National Championship Men's singles

2003
Winner Belgian National Championship Men's singles

2004
Winner Belgian National Championship Men's singles
Winner Belgian National Championship Men's doubles (together with partner Wouter Claes)

2005
Winner Belgian National Championship Men's singles
Winner Belgian National Championship Men's doubles (together with partner Wouter Claes)

References

Belgian male badminton players
Olympic badminton players of Belgium
Badminton players at the 2000 Summer Olympics
People from Nuenen, Gerwen en Nederwetten
1973 births
Living people
Sportspeople from North Brabant